Alamüdün is a district of Chüy Region in northern Kyrgyzstan. Its administrative seat is Lebedinovka. The district surrounds Bishkek, but does not include it, because the city forms a region-level unit of its own.

Population

Rural communities and villages
In total, Alamüdün District include 51 settlements in 17 rural communities. Each rural community can consist of one or several villages. The rural communities and settlements in the Alamudun District are:

Ak-Döbö (seat: Kayyrma; incl. Moldovanovka)
Ala-Archa (seat: Mramornoye; incl. Rassvet)
Alamüdün (seat: Alamüdün; incl. Sadovoye)
Arashan (seat: Arashan; incl. Tatyr)
Baytik (seat: Baytik; incl. Archaly, Baygeldi, Bash-Kara-Suu and Kashka-Suu)
Grozd (seat: Grozd; incl. At-Bashy, Birdik, Ekinchi Besh Jyldyk and Lesnoye)
Kara-Jygach (seat: Kara-Jygach; incl. Bek-Too)
Kök-Jar (seat: Kök-Jar)
Lebedinovka (seat: Lebedinovka; incl. Vostok and Dachnoye)
Lenin (seat: Lenin; incl. Konstantinovka and Mykan)
Mayevka (seat: Mayevka)
Oktyabr (seat: Oktyabr; incl. Lubyanoye and Chüy)
Prigorodnoye (seat: Prigorodnoye; incl. Ozernoye, Stepnoye and Dostuk)
Tash-Döbö (seat: Tash-Döbö; incl. Zarechnoye, Malinovka and Süymönkul Chokmorov)
Tash-Moynok (seat: Koy-Tash; incl. Besh-Künggöy, Gornaya Mayevka, Kyzyl-Birdik, Podgornoye, Prokhladnoye and Tash-Moynok)
Tömönkü Ala-Archa (seat: Tömönkü Ala-Archa)
Vasilyevka (seat: Vinogradnoye; incl. Vasilyevka, Polevoye and Privolnoye)

References

Districts of Chüy Region